Admiral Cowan may refer to

Michael L. Cowan (born 1944), U.S. Navy admiral and Surgeon General of the United States Navy
Walter Cowan, Admiral Sir Walter Henry Cowan, 1st Baronet
EML Admiral Cowan (M313), an Estonian minehunter named after him